Pacific Creek begins in the Teton Wilderness of Bridger-Teton National Forest in the U.S. state of Wyoming. The creek originates from North Two Ocean Creek, which splits into Pacific and Atlantic Creeks at Two Ocean Pass along the Continental Divide. Pacific Creek travels southwest into Grand Teton National Park and receives outflow from Two Ocean and Emma Matilda Lakes just before it empties into the Snake River immediately northwest of Moran, Wyoming.

References 

Rivers of Wyoming
Rivers of Teton County, Wyoming
River bifurcations
Wild and Scenic Rivers of the United States